Atlántico Fútbol Club is a Dominican professional football team based in Puerto Plata, Dominican Republic, founded in 2015. The team plays in the Liga Dominicana de Fútbol.

History
Founder Ruben Garcia decided to found the club in 2014 giving a perspective of football to the Puerto Plata as it is a town where the sport is not very popular. Part of the team's leaders are Arturo Heinsen team manager, Segundo Polanco, Fernando Ortega Zeller and his brother Gustavo Eduardo Zeller who have invested so that this team grows and is one of the best in the LDF Banco Popular.

Debut

The Atlantic FC debut as a visitor in the Dominican Football League on March 8, 2015, facing Club Barcelona Atlético, played at the Estadio De Fútbol Panamericano Parque Del Este, a result that ended 1–0 in favor of the locals.

First Goal Cry of the Club

The first goal of the history of the Atlantic FC in the Dominican Football League was scored by the Venezuelan Jorge Marquez Gomez on March 14, 2015 in a match corresponding to the second date of the league, the goal would reach the 75th minute since The penalty point, which was successfully charged by Marquez and gave the tie to the club, the game ended with a result of 1–1 against Atletico San Cristobal FC.

Atlantico FC was the first Dominican soccer club that participated on a CFU Club Championship, on February 24, 2016, against W Connection from the TT Pro League.

Stadium
Estadio Leonel Plácido: 2015–

Accomplishments
Liga Dominicana de Fútbol:
Champions: 2017
Runners-up: 2015

Players

Current roster

Current staff
Head Coach: Jean Carlos Güell
Sporting Director: Roberto Fernández Saralegui
Trainer: Francisco Martinez Castro
Physical trainer: Ariel Ventura

External links
https://web.archive.org/web/20150701160259/http://ldf.com.do/atlantico-futbol-club/
http://www.listindiario.com/el-deporte/2015/3/1/358249/El-futbol-llega-a-Puerto-Plata-El-Club-Atlantico-FC-con-grandes?AspxAutoDetectCookieSupport=1

Football clubs in the Dominican Republic
Association football clubs established in 2015
2015 establishments in the Dominican Republic